Eupithecia pallidicosta is a moth in the  family Geometridae. It is found in Peru.

References

Moths described in 1904
pallidicosta
Moths of South America